Todd Anthony Dulaney (born December 20, 1983) is an American gospel musician, and former baseball player. His music career started in 2011, with the release of the CD version, Pulling Me Through. This would be his breakthrough released upon the Billboard Gospel Albums chart. He would release another album, A Worshipper's Heart, in 2016 with EntertainmentOne Nashville, and this would place even higher on the Gospel Albums chart.

Early life
Dulaney was born on December 20, 1983 in Maywood, Illinois as Todd Anthony Dulaney, to Thomas and Tommye Dulaney. He was athletic as a youth playing sports in particular baseball, where he would play at a local community college, Wabash Valley College, getting drafted by the New York Mets in the 2002 MLB June Amateur Draft as a 32nd round selection. He never reached the major leagues, but played his short stint as a professional baseball player in the minor leagues. He decided after the 2005 season to retire from the sport because he felt God's call to play gospel music, which he did under the tutelage of artist, Smokie Norful, who asked him to tour with him.

Music career
His music recording career commenced in 2011, with the physical album, Pulling Me Through, and it was released on May 31, 2011 by Dulaney independently. This was his breakthrough release upon the Billboard Gospel Albums chart, placing at No. 43. His subsequent release, Pulling Me Through, was released by GoldStreet Gospel Records on January 22, 2013. This time it placed even higher at No. 23 on the aforementioned chart because it was released digitally along with extended content. He released A Worshipper's Heart on April 15, 2016, with Entertainment One Music. The album peaked at No. 1 on the Gospel Albums chart, while it got No. 150 on The Billboard 200 and No. 13 on the Independent Albums chart.

On June 11, 2021, Dulaney released the live album Anthems & Glory with Entertainment One Music. Dulaney earned his fifth Gospel Airplay No. 1 With 'Revelation 4' on the list dated September 25, 2021.

Discography

References

Todd Dulaney Features Nicole Harris In "You're Doing It All Again" Live Video. – 2019

External links
 Official website

1983 births
Living people
African-American songwriters
African-American Christians
Musicians from Illinois
Songwriters from Illinois
People from Forest Park, Illinois
People from Maywood, Illinois
21st-century African-American people
20th-century African-American people